DT may refer to:

Arts

Music
 Dt. (band), a Japanese dance/rock group
 "D.T.", an instrumental song on Who Made Who, AC/DC's 1986 album
 Dark Tranquillity, Swedish melodic death metal band
 Dream Theater, American progressive metal band
 MC DT, a UK garage emcee rap artist and member of DJ Pied Piper and the Masters of Ceremonies

Other media
 The Dark Tower (disambiguation), various works of fiction
 Dilithium (Star Trek), fictional chemical element by its symbol
 Ixion Saga DT, a television series

Businesses and organisations
 Dalarnas Tidningar, Swedish newspaper and media company
 Deutsche Telekom (by NYSE ticker symbol)
 Dhanmondi Tutorial, an educational organisation
 Dimosia Tileorasi, a former Greek public broadcaster
 Dynatrace, software intelligence provider (by NYSE stock symbol)
 TAAG Angola Airlines (IATA code: DT)
 Turkish State Theatres

Language and linguistics
 d/t, shorthand for "due to"
 Discourse transcription, in linguistics
 Daighi tongiong pingim, an orthography in the Latin alphabet for Taiwanese language

Places
 District, in abbreviations
 Downtown, in abbreviations
 Dakota Territory, the northernmost part of the land acquired in the Louisiana Purchase
 DT postcode area, including Dorchester and surrounding areas in southern England

Science and technology

Computing and telecommunications
 <dt></dt>, an HTML element for specifying definition data
 Daemon Tools, a disk image emulator
 Digital television, the transmission of television signals using digital encoding
 Digital transformation, the adoption of digital technology
 Decision tree, a decision support tool

Health and psychology
 DT vaccine, a diphtheria and tetanus vaccine
 Dark triad, a group of personality traits
 Delirium tremens, a medical condition of uncontrolled shaking, typically due to alcohol or drug withdrawal
 Drug Tariff price, the amount pharmacies in the United Kingdom get reimbursed for generic medications
 Digestive tract, the tract or passageway of the digestive system that leads from the mouth to the anus

Weapons
 Douglas DT, a U.S. Navy torpedo bomber
 DT, variant of the Degtyaryov machine gun for mounting and loading in armoured fighting vehicles

Other uses in science and technology
 DT, in nuclear fusion, the ratio of hydrogen isotopes deuterium and tritium
 Deuterium–tritium fusion, a type of nuclear fusion
 Navistar DT engine
 ΔT (timekeeping), the time difference between Universal Time (UT, defined by Earth's rotation) and Terrestrial Time (TT, independent of Earth's rotation

Other uses
 DT, latinised symbol for the Tunisian dinar
 Defensive tackle, a position in American football
 Design and technology, an area of study taught at schools and colleges
 Deuteronomy, the fifth book of the Hebrew Bible

See also
 Delirium Tremens (disambiguation)